Chromodes is a genus of moths of the family Crambidae. It contains only one species, Chromodes armeniacalis, which is found in Brazil.

References

Spilomelinae
Monotypic moth genera
Crambidae genera
Moths of South America
Taxa named by Achille Guenée